Knoephla, also spelled knephla , is a type of dumpling, commonly used in soups. The word is related to the modern German dialect word Knöpfle, meaning little knob/button. Traditional knoephla soup is a thick chicken and potato soup, almost to the point of being a stew.  It is particularly common in the U.S. states of Minnesota, South Dakota, and North Dakota, where there was significant settlement of German emigrants from the Russian Empire. There are different iterations known throughout, though the North Dakotan iteration typically contains just potatoes and dumplings.

See also
 Schupfnudel
 Klöße, larger dumplings
 Halušky, eastern European equivalent of spätzle
 Gnocchi, similar Italian pasta/dumplings
 Passatelli, similar Italian pasta made with bread crumbs in place of flour
 Spätzle

External links
Knoephla Soup Recipe By Mike Tifft
The Taste of Home online recipe:  
The Dakota Memories Heritage Tour listing knoephla as one of the ethnic foods to be served:  

Dumplings
Cuisine of the Midwestern United States
German-American cuisine
German-Russian culture in the United States